Nazim Burke (born September 1956) is a politician & Opposition Leader from the island of Carriacou which is part of the tri island state of Grenada. He was born in Belair Carriacou as Victor Gordon Burke and changed his name to Victor Nazim Gordon Burke.
He served as the nation's Minister of Finance, Planning, Economic Development, Energy and Foreign Trade during the reign of the NDC government, from 2008 to 2013, headed by Tillman Thomas. He was elected as the political leader of the NDC at a party convention in early 2014 after Tillman Thomas stepped aside following the loss at the 2013 elections. Burke resigned as party leader in July 2018 following his party's disastrous election results in that year's election in which the party failed to gain any seats leaving it out of the house of representatives for a third time. He was succeeded by his Deputy Joseph Andall as acting leader pending a new leadership election due no later than March 2019.

References

1956 births
Living people
Members of the House of Representatives of Grenada
Finance ministers of Grenada
National Democratic Congress (Grenada) politicians
Carriacouan politicians
Members of the Senate of Grenada
21st-century Grenadian politicians
Concordia University alumni
University of Windsor alumni